José Cruz Gutiérrez (born June 10, 1982, in Guadalajara, Jalisco) is a former Mexican professional footballer who played in Liga MX with Monterrey. He is best known as "Pepe Cruz"

Career
Gutiérrez began his football career with C.F. Monterrey, making his Mexican Primera División debut with Rayados in 2002. He only made fourteen appearances during his three years with the club, eventually dropping down to play for Indios de Chihuahua in the Primera A División during 2008. He led Indios by scoring nine goals in the Apertura 2008 tournament, leading the parent club's manager, Héctor Hugo Eugui, to consider signing him for the Clausura 2009 season.

Gutiérrez joined Club Universidad de Guadalajara in 2013, and helped Leones Negros gain promotion from Ascenso MX in 2014. However, he would join Correcaminos UAT and stay in Ascenso MX for the following tournament.

Honors

Club
Irapuato
 Liga de Ascenso: Clausura 2011

References

External links

1982 births
Living people
Mexican footballers
C.F. Monterrey players
Irapuato F.C. footballers
Lobos BUAP footballers
Leones Negros UdeG footballers
Footballers from Guadalajara, Jalisco
Association football forwards